State Like Sleep is a 2018 American drama film written and directed by Meredith Danluck. It stars Katherine Waterston, Michael Shannon, Luke Evans, and Michiel Huisman. It premiered at the 2018 Tribeca Film Festival, and was released on January 4, 2019, by The Orchard.

Premise
The film is centered on an owner and operator behind the club "Lebellfleur" - a secret high class gentleman's club that a woman thinks keeps the answers to her husband's death.

Cast
 Katherine Waterston as Katherine Grand
 Michael Shannon as Edward
 Luke Evans as Emile
 Michiel Huisman as Stefan Delvoe
 Mary Kay Place as Elaine Grand
 Julie Khaner as Anneke Delvoe
 Mark O'Brien as Darren
 Bo Martyn as Frieda
 Carlo Rota as Dr. Iyengar

Filming
Filming took place in Toronto and Cambridge, Ontario in mid-2016.

Release
The film had its world premiere at the Tribeca Film Festival on April 21, 2018. Shortly after, The Orchard acquired distribution rights to the film. It was released on January 4, 2019.

Critical reception 
On review aggregate website Rotten Tomatoes, State Like Sleep has an approval rating of 37% based on 30 reviews. The site’s critics consensus reads, "State Like Sleep fails to engage despite the efforts of a talented cast, leaving viewers with a would-be thriller that has an unfortunately descriptive title."

References

External links 

State Like Sleep at Rotten Tomatoes
2018 films
2018 independent films
Films shot in Toronto
American drama films
2010s thriller drama films
American thriller drama films
2010s English-language films
2010s American films